The Samjiyon tablet computer is a North Korean Android tablet computer developed by the Multimedia Technology Research Institute of the Korea Computer Center. It is the first North Korean tablet able to receive television broadcasts.
It is named after the Samjiyon lake.
Samjiyon includes a browser with a support for the North Korean Kwangmyong intranet. However, there is no Wi-Fi support.

The computers are assumed to have been built in China, and the software has been localized for North Korea.

Applications
Some apps reported to be available include:
e-book library (also includes those on Juche study)
Calculator (수산기, 數算機)
Games
 Abstract strategy games like Chosun Jang-Gi (조선장기, 朝鮮將棋): Korean janggi (a form of chess)
 Rubber Slingshot shooting (a North Korean game similar to the game Angry Birds)
 Fishing Joy
 Tank Recon 3D
 Air Control
 Racing Moto
 Basketball shooting
 Fishing Joy
 Marbles game
Word processor, spreadsheet editor, and slideshow apps
Dictionary

Language support
It supports Korean, German, Russian, English, French and Japanese inputs.

See also 

 Ullim
 Arirang (smartphone)
 Notel
 Internet in North Korea
 Telecommunications in North Korea

References 

Tablet computers
Economy of North Korea
Information technology in North Korea
Android (operating system) devices